The 2000 All-Ireland Minor Hurling Championship was the 70th staging of the All-Ireland Minor Hurling Championship since its establishment by the Gaelic Athletic Association in 1928. The championship began on 22 April 2000 and ended on 10 September 2000.

Galway entered the championship as the defending champions.

On 10 September 2000, Galway won the championship following a 2-19 to 4-10 defeat of Cork in the All-Ireland final. This was their fifth All-Ireland title overall and their second title in-a-row.

Offaly's Brian Carroll was the championship's top scorer with 2-39.

Results

Leinster Minor Hurling Championship

Round robin

Semi-finals

Final

Munster Minor Hurling Championship

Quarter-finals

Semi-finals

Final

Ulster Minor Hurling Championship

Semi-final

Final

All-Ireland Minor Hurling Championship

Quarter-finals

Semi-finals

Final

Championship statistics

Top scorers

Top scorers overall

Top scorers in a single game

References

External links
 All-Ireland Minor Hurling Championship: Roll Of Honour

Minor
All-Ireland Minor Hurling Championship